Benjamin Tonks (1832 – 27 June 1884) was a 19th-century mayor and Member of Parliament in Auckland, New Zealand.

Tonks was elected to the Parnell electorate of the Auckland Provincial Council in 1871. He represented Parnell in the 6th and 7th council until the abolition of provincial government in 1876.

He was the Mayor of Auckland City from 1875 to 1876.

At the 1876 by-election which followed the resignation of Sir George Grey, he was elected to represent the City of Auckland West electorate. He resigned in 1877.

He died at his home in Remuera on 27 June 1884.

References

1832 births
1884 deaths
Members of the New Zealand House of Representatives
Mayors of Auckland
19th-century New Zealand people
New Zealand MPs for Auckland electorates
19th-century New Zealand politicians
Members of the Auckland Provincial Council